Copenhagen Convention can mean:
Copenhagen Convention of 1857 governing transit passage through the Danish straits, whereby a group of shipping nations bought out the Sound Dues in the Øresund
A bidding convention used in bridge; see Copenhagen convention (bridge)
 Copenhagen Accord, a document adopted at United Nations Climate Change Conference 2009

See also
 Treaty of Copenhagen (disambiguation)
Treaty of Copenhagen (1660)
Treaty of Copenhagen (1441)